Antonio Casoar (17 January 1934 – 6 July 2015) was an Italian rower. He competed in the men's eight event at the 1956 Summer Olympics.

References

External links
 

1934 births
2015 deaths
Italian male rowers
Olympic rowers of Italy
Rowers at the 1956 Summer Olympics
People from Brindisi
Sportspeople from the Province of Brindisi